KBS MUSIC is a Korean radio station tuned nationwide via a Digital Multimedia Broadcasting audio channel.

Seoul : CH 12B
Chuncheon : CH 13B
Daejeon/Cheongju : CH 11B
Gwangju/Jeonju: CH 12B/CH 8B/CH 7B
Daegu : CH 7B/CH 9B
Busan/Ulsan : CH 12B/CH 9B
Jeju : CH 13B/CH 8B

References 
 Listen Live (DMB) (Official)
 Watch Live (FM) (Official)

Radio stations in South Korea
Korean Broadcasting System radio networks